John Carbutt (1832–1905) was a photographic pioneer, stereo card publisher, and photographic entrepreneur. He came to be the first to use celluloid for photographic film and to market dry-plate glass negatives. 

He was born in Sheffield, England on 2 December 1832. He moved to Chicago in 1853.

In 1866, as the official photographer for the Union Pacific Railroad, he produced the series of stereographic cards titled Rail Road Excursion to the 100th Meridian. The series celebrated the crossing of the border between the western and eastern United States in October 1866 during the construction of the transcontinental railroad.

Carbutt founded the Keystone Dry Plate Works in 1879 and was the first to develop sheets of celluloid coated with photographic emulsion for making celluloid film in 1888. Carbutt sliced thin plates from a rigid celluloid block, and then coated them with a silver gelatin emulsion to make a Celluloid Dry plate. Around 1890 he made them in a 35 mm width for William Kennedy Dickson's Kinetoscope, which set the 35 mm film standard for motion picture cameras and still cameras. That image format is one of the dominant formats to this day, as the majority of high end digital cameras use a 35mm frame-sized sensor and 35mm film is still being used by some photographers and film makers.

Carbutt is interred at West Laurel Hill Cemetery, Bala Cynwyd, Pennsylvania.

See also
 History of photography

References

External links

19th-century American inventors
Cinema pioneers
Pioneers of photography
1832 births
1905 deaths
History of film
Photographers from Illinois
Businesspeople from Chicago
English emigrants to the United States
People from Sheffield
19th-century American photographers
19th-century American scientists
Burials at West Laurel Hill Cemetery